Events from the year 1937 in Michigan.

Office holders

State office holders
 Governor of Michigan: Frank Murphy (Democrat)
 Lieutenant Governor of Michigan: Thomas Read (Republican)/Leo J. Nowicki (Democrat)
 Michigan Attorney General: Raymond Wesley Starr
 Michigan Secretary of State: Leon D. Case (Democrat)
 Speaker of the Michigan House of Representatives: George A. Schroeder (Democrat)
 Chief Justice, Michigan Supreme Court:

Mayors of major cities
 Mayor of Detroit: Frank Couzens (Republican)
 Mayor of Grand Rapids: Tunis Johnson
 Mayor of Flint: Harold E. Bradshaw
 Mayor of Saginaw: Frank Marxer/Francis J. McDonald
 Mayor of Lansing: Max A. Templeton
 Mayor of Ann Arbor: Robert A. Campbell/Walter C. Sadler

Federal office holders
 U.S. Senator from Michigan: Prentiss M. Brown (Democrat)
 U.S. Senator from Michigan: Arthur Vandenberg (Republican) 
 House District 1: George G. Sadowski (Democrat)
 House District 2: Earl C. Michener (Republican)
 House District 3: Paul W. Shafer (Republican)
 House District 4: Clare Hoffman (Republican)
 House District 5: Carl E. Mapes (Republican)
 House District 6: Andrew J. Transue (Democrat)
 House District 7: Jesse P. Wolcott (Republican)
 House District 8: Fred L. Crawford (Republican)
 House District 9: Albert J. Engel (Republican)
 House District 10: Roy O. Woodruff (Republican)
 House District 11: John F. Luecke (Democrat)
 House District 12: Frank Eugene Hook (Democrat)
 House District 13: George D. O'Brien (Republican)
 House District 14: Louis C. Rabaut (Democrat)
 House District 15: John D. Dingell Sr. (Democrat)
 House District 16: John Lesinski Sr. (Democrat)
 House District 17: George Anthony Dondero (Republican)

Population

Sports

Baseball
 1937 Detroit Tigers season – Under player-manager Mickey Cochrane, the Tigers compiled an 89-65 record and finished in second place in the American League. Second baseman Charlie Gehringer led the league with a .371 batting average and was selected as the American League Most Valuable Player (MVP). First baseman Hank Greenberg led the league with 184 RBIs and 104 extra base hits and finished third in the MVP voting. Four Tigers ranked among the league's top 10 in batting average: Gehringer (.371), Greenberg (.337), Gee Walker (.335), and Pete Fox (.331). Roxie Lawson led the pitching staff with 18 wins, and Elden Auker led with a 3.88 earned run average.
 1937 Michigan Wolverines baseball season - Under head coach Ray Fisher, the Wolverines compiled a 16–9 record. Lyle Williams was the team captain.

American football
 1937 Detroit Lions season – Under head coach Potsy Clark, the Lions compiled a 7–4 record and placed second in the NFL's Western Division. The team's statistical leaders included Bill Shepherd with 297 passing yards, Dutch Clark with 468 rushing yards and 45 points scored, and Ed Klewicki with 134 receiving yards. 
 1937 Michigan Wolverines football team – The Wolverines compiled a 4–4 record under head coach Harry Kipke.
 1937 Michigan State Spartans football team – Under head coach Charlie Bachman, the Spartans compiled an 8–2 record and lost to Auburn in the 1938 Orange Bowl.
 1937 Detroit Titans football team – The Titans compiled a 7–3 record under head coach Gus Dorais.
 1937 Wayne Tartars football team – The Tartars compiled a 6–2 record under head coach Joe Gembis.
 1937 Central Michigan Bearcats football team - Under head coach Ron Finch the Bercats compiled a 6–2 record.
 1937 Western State Hilltoppers football team - Under head coach Mike Gary, the Hilltoppers compiled a 5–3 record.
 1937 Michigan State Normal Hurons football team - Under head coach Elton Rynearson, the Hurons compiled a 5–2–1 record.

Basketball
 1936–37 Western Michigan Broncos men's basketball team – Under head coach Buck Read, the Broncos compiled a 13–4 record.
 1936–37 Detroit Titans men's basketball team – Under head coach Lloyd Brazil, the Titans compiled an 11–5 record.
 1936–37 Michigan Wolverines men's basketball team – Under head coach Franklin Cappon, the Wolverines compiled a 16–4  record. Johnny Gee was the team captain, and John "Jake" Townsend was the team's high scorer with 191 points.
 1936–37 Michigan State Spartans men's basketball team – Under head coach Benjamin Van Alstyne, the Spartans compiled a 5–12 record.
 1936–37 Wayne Tartars men's basketball team – Under coach Newman Ertell, Wayne compiled a 13–4 record.

Ice hockey
 1936–37 Detroit Red Wings season – Under coach Jack Adams, the Red Wings compiled a 25–14–9 record, finished in first place in the National Hockey League (NHL) American Division, and defeated the New York Rangers in the 1937 Stanley Cup Finals. The team's statistical leaders included Larry Aurie with 23 goals and Marty Barry with 27 assists 44 points and Herbie Lewis with 23 assists. Normie Smith was the team's goaltender. 
 1936–37 Michigan Wolverines men's ice hockey team – Under head coach Ed Lowrey, the Wolverines compiled an 11–6–1 record.
 1936–37 Michigan Tech Huskies men's ice hockey team – Under head coach Bert Noblet, the Huskies compiled a 7–8–3 record.

Other
 Port Huron to Mackinac Boat Race – 
 Michigan Open - 
 APBA Gold Cup –

Chronology of events

January

February

March

April

May

June

July

August

September

October

November

December

Births
 March 6 - Ivan Boesky, stock trader known for role in insider trading scandal in the mid-1980s, in Detroit
 March 25 - Tom Monaghan, founder and owner of Domino's Pizza (1959-1998), owner of Detroit Tigers (1983-1992), in Ann Arbor, Michigan
 April 2 - Dick Radatz, Major League Baseball pitcher (1962–1969), in Detroit
 April 6 - Phil Regan, Major League Baseball pitcher (1960–1972), known as "The Vulture", in Otsego, Michigan
 April 14 - Paul Kangas, co-anchor of PBS' Nightly Business Report (1979-2009), in Houghton, Michigan
 April 16 - George Steele, professional wrestler and actor (Ed Wood, in Detroit
 May 4 - Ron Carter, jazz double bassist, member of the Miles Davis Quintet in the early 1960s, the most recorded bassist in history, in Ferndale, Michigan
 August 5 - Gordon Johncock, racing driver, 2x winner of the Indianapolis 500, in Hastings, Michigan
 August 27 - Alice Coltrane, jazz pianist, organist, harpist, singer, composer, swamini, and second wife of John Coltrane, in Detroit
 August 29 - Chuck Shonta AFL cornerback (1960–1967), in Detroit

Gallery of 1937 births

Deaths
 January 20 - Michael Gallagher, Archbishop of Detroit (1918-1937), at age 70 in Detroit
 March 7 - Lady Baldwin, Major League Baseball pitcher (1884-1890) who won 42 games for the Detroit Wolverines in 1886, at age 77 in Hastings, Michigan
 April 14 - Ned Hanlon, member of Baseball Hall of Fame who played for Detroit Wolverines (1881-1888), in Baltimore
 April 25 - Clem Sohn, air show daredevil, at age 26 in France
 July 2- Joe Yeager, Major League Baseball player (1898-1908) who led the Detroit Tigers with a 2.61 ERA in 1901, in Detroit

Gallery of 1937 deaths

See also
 History of Michigan
 History of Detroit

References